Clach Chairidh, alternatively named Clach Biorach (from Scots Gaelic, meaning 'the Pointed Stone'), is a Class I Pictish stone located in a field near the village of Edderton in Easter Ross.

The standing stone was probably erected at some time in the Neolithic to Middle Bronze Age (4000 BC to 1500 BC), and Pictish symbols were later engraved at some time in the Late Iron Age to Early Medieval period (500 AD to 700 AD) on its north face. The symbols are a salmon above a double-disc with a Z-rod. When first recorded in 1780, a circle which is no longer visible was shown below on the left, which could have been part of a mirror. It is sandstone, 3.13m high, and at the base it has a width of 1.07m and depth of 0.46m.

Gallery

See also
Celtic art
Edderton Cross Slab

References

Pictish stones
Pictish stones in Highland (council area)